Tru 2 da Game is the fourth studio album released by New Orleans hip-hop group, TRU. It was released February 18, 1997 on No Limit Records and was produced by  Beats By the Pound . The album found a large amount of success, peaking at #8 on the Billboard 200 and #2 on the Top R&B/Hip-Hop Albums selling 200,000 copies in its first week. A single from the album entitled "I Always Feel Like..." also found some success, peaking at #71 on the Billboard Hot 100, #11 on the Hot Rap Singles and #42 on the Hot R&B/Hip-Hop Singles & Tracks. The same year the album was re-released with the song "Smoking Green" removed. The re-released version included three new songs, a club mix version of "No Limit Soldiers", a C-Murder solo song "Eyes Of A Killa" and a Silkk The Shocker solo song "Pimp Shit." "FEDz" samples Aaliyah's hit single "If Your Girl Only Knew". The album was certified 2× Platinum by the RIAA, on October 2, 1997, and remains the group's most successful album.

Track listing
Original Release Track List - Tru 2 da Game

Track listing
Re-release Track List - Tru 2 da Game

Music videos

I Always Feel Like... featuring Mia X & Mo B. Dick 

FEDz featuring Mia X

Samples
"I Always Feel Like..." samples "Somebody's Watching Me" by Rockwell featuring Michael Jackson

"I Got Candy" samples "Candy" by Cameo

"FEDz" samples "If Your Girl Only Knew" by Aaliyah

"Smoking Green" samples "Summer Breeze" by Seals & Croft

"TRU 2 Da Game" samples "Why Have I Lost You?" by Cameo

"Pop Goes My 9" samples "(Pop, Pop, Pop, Pop) Goes My Mind" by LeVert

"TRU ?'s" samples "No More ?'s" by Eazy-E

Charts

Weekly charts

Year-end charts

Certifications

References

1997 albums
TRU (group) albums
No Limit Records albums
Priority Records albums